Total is the first greatest hits album by Spanish pop rock singer Belinda.

Album information 
The compilation includes songs from her soap operas, such as "¡Amigos X Siempre!", "Aventuras En El Tiempo" and "Cómplices Al Rescate". It is known that Belinda was not involved in the releasing of this compilation as the song "Alcanzar La Libertad" is a version not made by her.

Track listing

Special edition (DVD)

References 

2006 greatest hits albums
Belinda Peregrín albums
2006 video albums
Music video compilation albums